Şıxımlı, Fuzuli, Azerbaijan
 Şıxımlı, Kurdamir, Azerbaijan